Barbara Halina Eustachiewicz (born 5 November 1938) is a retired Polish gymnast. She competed at the 1960 and 1964 Summer Olympic Games in all artistic gymnastics events and finished in fifth and seventh place in the team competition, respectively. Her best individual result was 24th place all-around in 1960.

References

1938 births
Living people
Gymnasts at the 1960 Summer Olympics
Gymnasts at the 1964 Summer Olympics
Olympic gymnasts of Poland
Polish female artistic gymnasts
Sportspeople from Katowice